Sejingkat was a state constituency in Sarawak, Malaysia, that was represented in the Sarawak State Legislative Assembly from 1991 to 1996.

The state constituency was created in the 1987 redistribution and was mandated to return a single member to the Sarawak State Legislative Assembly under the first past the post voting system.

History
It was abolished in 1996 after it was redistributed.

Representation history

Election results

References

Defunct Sarawak state constituencies
1987 establishments in Malaysia
1996 disestablishments in Malaysia